The 2020–21 Scottish Cup was the 136th season of Scotland's most prestigious football knockout competition. The tournament did not have a sponsor, after William Hill's nine-year partnership with the Scottish FA came to an end following the 2019–20 tournament.

This was the second season in which a match from every round of the tournament proper was broadcast live via TV partners Premier Sports and BBC Scotland, with one match in the first and second rounds being shown live on the BBC Scotland channel for the second time.

The defending champions were Celtic, who won the 2020 Scottish Cup Final on 20 December 2020. Celtic lost to their Old Firm rivals Rangers in the fourth round, which was their first defeat in the competition since 2015–16.

St Johnstone were the winners of the Scottish Cup, beating Hibernian 1–0 in the final on 22 May to complete a historic cup Double, becoming only the 2nd ever team outside of the Old Firm to do so since Aberdeen in the 1989–90 season.

Calendar
The calendar for the 2020–21 Scottish Cup, as announced by Scottish Football Association on 27 October 2020. On 11 January 2021, the competition was suspended by the Scottish FA due to the COVID-19 pandemic in Scotland. On 3 March 2021, new dates for the competition were announced.

The format featured several changes from the previous season because of the increased number of eligible clubs and the tournament's compressed schedule. Due to the potential for fixture congestion during the COVID-19 pandemic, replays were not played during the 2020–21 competition.

Preliminary rounds

Preliminary round one
The first preliminary round took place on the weekend of 28 November 2020. There were 26 entries at this stage - 20 from the East of Scotland Football League, 4 from the South of Scotland Football League, 1 from the West of Scotland Football League and 1 from the SJFA North Region. 22 clubs with a valid club licence received a bye to the next round.

Dunipace, Haddington Athletic, Newtongrange Star, and Tranent Juniors took part in the Scottish Cup for the first time having each gained their Club Licence, along with Musselburgh Athletic who made their debut as 2019–20 South & East Cup-Winners Shield winners.

Auchinleck Talbot, Burntisland Shipyard, Girvan, and Golspie Sutherland withdrew from the competition after the initial format was announced.

Clubs marked ‡ were ineligible for a bye to the second preliminary round.

Draw

Banks O' Dee, Blackburn United, Broxburn Athletic, Camelon Juniors, Coldstream, Dundonald Bluebell, Dunipace, Easthouses Lily Miners Welfare, Glasgow University, Haddington Athletic, Hawick Royal Albert United, Hill of Beath Hawthorn, Jeanfield Swifts, Linlithgow Rose, Newton Stewart, Newtongrange Star, Preston Athletic, Threave Rovers, Tranent Juniors, Tynecastle, Whitehill Welfare and Wigtown & Bladnoch received a bye to the second preliminary round.

Matches

Preliminary round two
The second preliminary round took place on the weekend of 12 December 2020. Along with the two winners from the first preliminary round and 22 teams with byes, there were 28 new entries at this stage - 14 from the Highland Football League and 14 from the Lowland Football League.

Forres Mechanics and Gretna 2008 withdrew from the competition after the initial format was announced.

Draw
Teams in Italics were unknown at the time of the draw. Teams in Bold advanced to the first round.

Matches

First round
The first round took place on the weekend of 26 December 2020. Along with the 26 winners from the second preliminary round, there were 14 new entries at this stage - two from the Highland Football League (Brora Rangers and Fraserburgh), two from the Lowland Football League (Kelty Hearts and Bonnyrigg Rose Athletic) and all 10 teams from League Two.

Draw
The draw for the first round took place on Sunday 13 December 2020 at 10am live on the Scottish Cup YouTube, Facebook and Twitter accounts.

Teams in Italics were unknown at the time of the draw. Teams in bold advanced to the second round.

Matches

Replay

Second round
The second round was scheduled to take place on the weekend of 9 January 2021, however a number of matches were postponed following freezing temperatures. Along with the 20 winners from the first round, there were 20 new entries at this stage - all 10 teams from League One and the Championship.

Draw
The draw for the second round took place on Monday 28 December 2020 at 7:15pm live on the Scottish Cup YouTube, Facebook and Twitter accounts. Teams in Italics were unknown at the time of the draw. Teams in bold advanced to the third round.

Matches

Postponed ties
On 11 January 2021, the Scottish FA announced that competitions below the Championship would be suspended as a result of the COVID-19 pandemic in Scotland. As a result, the remaining second round ties were postponed. The remaining matches took place on 23 March 2021.

Third round
The third round was originally scheduled to take place on the weekend of 30 January 2021 but instead took place in April 2021 as a result of the COVID-19 pandemic in Scotland. Along with the 20 winners from the second round, there were 12 new entries at this stage - all from the Premiership.

Draw
The draw for the third round took place on Sunday 10 January 2021 at 11am live on the Scottish Cup YouTube, Facebook and Twitter accounts.

Teams in Italics were unknown at the time of the draw. Teams in bold advanced to the fourth round.

Matches

Fourth round
The fourth round took place on the weekend of 17 April 2021.

Draw
The draw for the fourth round took place on Sunday 4 April 2021 at 2pm live on the Scottish Cup YouTube, Facebook and Twitter accounts.

Teams in Italics were unknown at the time of the draw. Teams in Bold advanced to the quarter-finals.

Matches
Following the death of Prince Philip, Duke of Edinburgh, the fourth round matches were rearranged to avoid clashing with his funeral on 17 April 2021.

Quarter-finals
The quarter-finals took place on the weekend of 24 April 2021.

Draw
The draw for the quarter-finals took place on Sunday 4 April 2021 at 2pm live on the Scottish Cup YouTube, Facebook and Twitter accounts.

Matches

Semi-finals
The semi-finals took place at Hampden Park on the weekend of 8 May 2021.

Draw
The draw for the semi-finals took place on Monday 26 April 2021 live on BBC Scotland following the Kilmarnock v St Mirren tie. Teams in Bold advanced to the final.

Matches

Final

The final was played on 22 May 2021 at Hampden Park in Glasgow. Originally it was scheduled for 8 May 2021 but was pushed back due to the coronavirus pandemic.

Broadcasting
The Scottish Cup was broadcast by Premier Sports and BBC Scotland. Premier Sports had the first 2 picks of Round 3 and Round 4, the quarter-finals as well as first pick of one semi-final and aired the final non-exclusively. BBC Scotland broadcast one match per round from the first round and two matches per round from the second round to the quarter-finals, as well as one semi-final and the final.

The following matches were broadcast live on UK television:

References

2020–21 in Scottish football cups
2020-21
2020–21 European domestic association football cups